John Lincoln Green (October 14, 1921March 6, 1989) was an American football defensive end in the National Football League. He played five seasons for the Philadelphia Eagles (1947–1951).  He went to one Pro Bowl during his five-year career.  Green played college football at the University of Tulsa and was drafted in the sixteenth round of the 1944 NFL Draft.

External links

1921 births
1989 deaths
People from Jefferson County, Oklahoma
Players of American football from Oklahoma
American football defensive ends
Tulsa Golden Hurricane football players
Philadelphia Eagles players
Eastern Conference Pro Bowl players